Kailash Rai Saraswati Vidya Mandir, Kodarma  started functioning in 1987 with 27 students. The school functions under the guidance and supervision of Vidya Bharati Akhil Bharatiya Shiksha Sansthan. Today there are more than 1500 students, who take classes from Pre-Nursery to Std XII (Commerce and Science streams). It has grand and beautiful buildings, including classrooms, an administrative block, a well-equipped library, computer rooms and science laboratories. The medium of instruction is English but equal emphasis is placed on the study and proficiency in Hindi and Sanskrit. It is a co-educational school (10+2) affiliated with CBSE

SALIENT FEATURES

◆ Yoga Classes by Experts

◆ Music & Dance with Traditional & Modern Musical Instruments

◆ Games & Sports (Indoor & Outdoor Facilities)

◆ ART & CRAFT

◆ Students Council-Four Houses

(i) Madhav Sadan

(ii) Keshav Sadan

(iii) Vivekanand Sadan

(iv) Lakshmybai Sadan

◆ Seminar, Debate, Quiz & Essay Competitions are organized.

◆ Career based Exams & Counselling Common Room for girls

◆ The weak and slow learners are given individual attention.

◆ Medical facility and room for the sick.

◆ C.B.S.E. Curriculum

◆ Classes From One to Twelve (Science & commerce)

◆ Highly Qualified & Experienced Teaching Staff

◆ Well  Furnished Library cum Reading Room with a sufficient collection of books, magazines and newspapers

◆ Well Equipped Science Laboratories

◆ Emphasis on Value Education, Character-Building, Total Personality Development

◆ Computer Education with Internet

◆ Bus facility for all directions

◆ Educational trips under the guidance of faculty.

◆ A high order of discipline maintained

◆Tata Class Edge (E-education) Digital Study

◆ Career Counselling & Guidance

See also
Education in India

References

External links 
ApnaSchool.com is for sale
Complete Information Form

Koderma district
High schools and secondary schools in Jharkhand
Vidya Bharati schools